Lady Moyra Blanche Madeleine Browne  (née Ponsonby; 2 March 1918 – 4 December 2016) was a British nurse and the only daughter of the 9th Earl of Bessborough, an Anglo-Irish peer, and his wife Roberte.

On 10 December 1945, she became the second wife of Sir Denis Browne (widower of Helen Simpson since 1940), a distinguished paediatric surgeon based at Great Ormond Street Hospital (GOSH) from 1922 to 1967. The Sir Denis Browne Gold Medal from the British Association of Paediatric Surgeons was named in his honour. After her husband's death in 1967, Lady Moyra was vice-president of the Royal College of Nursing from 1970 to 1985, Superintendent-in-Chief of St. John Ambulance from 1970 to 1983 and Governor of Research into Ageing from 1987 to 1989.

Lady Moyra and Sir Denis had two children, a son and a daughter. Her son was barrister Desmond John Michael Browne  (b. 1947), a former Chairman of the Bar of England and Wales.

Death
Lady Moyra Browne died on 4 December 2016, aged 98, at her home. Her funeral, on 13 December, was at St Paul's Chapel, Stansted Park.

Honours
Dame Commander of the Order of the British Empire (1977)
Dame Grand Cross of the Order of St John

References

1918 births
2016 deaths
Moyra Browne
British nursing administrators
Dames Commander of the Order of the British Empire
Dames Grand Cross of the Order of St John
Daughters of Irish earls
Daughters of British earls
Wives of knights